Sherman Township is a township in Story County, Iowa, USA.  As of the 2000 census, its population was 214.

Geography
According to the USGS, it contains one cemetery: the Sparrow Cemetery.

 U.S. Route 65 runs north and south through the township and County Road E29 runs east–west.

References
 USGS Geographic Names Information System (GNIS)

External links
 US-Counties.com
 City-Data.com

Townships in Story County, Iowa
Townships in Iowa